Beşiktaş Handball Team is the professional handball team of Beşiktaş J.K., which is a Turkish sports club from Istanbul. The club plays their home matches at the Süleyman Seba Sport Complex.

Kits

Honors

Domestic
 Turkish Super League :
 Winners (16 — Record): 1980, 1981, 2005, 2007, 2009, 2010, 2011, 2012, 2013, 2014, 2015, 2016, 2017, 2018, 2019, 2022
 Runners (2): 1996, 2006
 Third Place (6): 1997, 1998, 1999, 2000, 2001, 2008
 Turkish Cup :
 Winners (14): 1999, 2001, 2005, 2006, 2009, 2010, 2011, 2012, 2014, 2015, 2016, 2017, 2018, 2019 (Record)
 Runners (2): 1998, 2007
 Turkish Super Cup :
 Winners (13): 1980, 1981, 2005, 2006, 2007, 2010, 2012, 2014, 2015, 2016, 2017, 2018, 2019 (Record)
 Runners (4): 1999, 2001, 2011, 2013

International
 Challenge Cup:
 Semi Final (1): 2009
 Quarter Final (1): 2003

European record

Current squad
Squad for the 2019–20 season

Goalkeepers
1  Mehmet Doğukan Karatay
 22  Taner Günay
Right Wingers
 23  Doğukan Keser
 25  Marko Lasica
 35  Şevket Yağmuroğlu
Left Wingers
 27  Tomislav Nuić
 37  Mijo Tomić
Line players
 14  Mehmet Demirezen
 20  Tolga Özbahar

Left Backs
 11  Josip Buljubašić
 29  YOUCEF FERHAT
 42  Yiğit Yaşar Kocaarslan
Central Backs
 21  Onur Ersin
 77  Gökay Bilim
 23  Mustapha Hadj Sadok
Right Backs
7  Özgür Sarak
 53  Ramazan Döne

Famous players
  Vedran Zrnić
  Josip Buljubašić
  Tomislav Nuić
  Valeri Parshkov
  Vladimir Zelić
  David Rašić
  Marko Krsmančić
  Vadzim Lisitsa
  Aco Jonovski
  Filip Lazarov
  Nemanja Pribak
  Karim Handawy

References

External links
 EHF Champions League website 
 Official website 

Beşiktaş J.K.
Sport in Beşiktaş
1978 establishments in Turkey
Turkish handball clubs